Qarabağlı (also, Kalabegla, Karabagly, Kalabegli, and Kalabekly) is a village and municipality in the Agsu Rayon of Azerbaijan.  It has a population of 222.

References 

Populated places in Agsu District